A graphic designer is a professional within the graphic design and graphic arts industry who assembles together images, typography, or motion graphics to create a piece of design. A graphic designer creates the graphics primarily for published, printed, or electronic media, such as brochures and advertising. They are also sometimes responsible for typesetting, illustration, user interfaces. A core responsibility of the designer's job is to present information in a way that is both accessible and memorable.

Qualifications

Designers should be able to solve visual communication problems or challenges. In doing so, the designer must identify the communications issue, gather and analyze information related to the issue, and generate potential approaches aimed at solving the problem.  Iterative prototyping and user testing can be used to determine the success or failure of a visual solution. Approaches to a communications problem are developed in the context of an audience and a media channel.  Graphic designers must understand the social and cultural norms of that audience in order to develop visual solutions that are perceived as relevant, understandable and effective.

Graphic designers should also have a thorough understanding of production and rendering methods. Some of the technologies and methods of production are drawing, offset printing, photography, and time-based and interactive media (film, video, computer multimedia). Frequently, designers are also called upon to manage color in different media. For instance, graphic designers use different colors for digital and print advertisements. RGB - standing for red, green, blue - is an additive color model used for digital media designs. However, the CMYK color model is made up of subtractive colors - cyan, magenta, yellow, and black - and used in designing print media. The reason for the different models is that when designing print ads, colors look different on the screen and when printed onto paper. For example, the colors appear darker on paper than on screen.

See also
Graphic design occupations
List of graphic designers
Mood board

References 

Computer occupations
Computational fields of study 
Mass media occupations
 
Visual arts occupations
Office and administrative support occupations